Wilford Suspension Bridge, also known as Meadows Suspension Bridge, was originally known as the Welbeck Suspension Bridge. It is a combined suspension footbridge for pedestrians and cyclists, and aqueduct which crosses the River Trent, linking the town of West Bridgford to the Meadows, in the city of Nottingham, England.  It also carries a gas main.

The bridge is owned by Severn Trent Water.  It should not be confused with the separate Wilford Toll Bridge.

There is no public right of way along the bridge, and so it can be closed by Severn Trent Water whenever it is deemed expedient to do so.

It is a Grade II listed structure.

History
The bridge was designed by the engineer Arthur Brown, of Elliott & Brown (Civil and Structural Engineering Consultancy). The plans were drawn up by Frank Beckett Lewis, the City Architect. It was constructed by the Nottingham Corporation Water Department at a cost of £8,871 (equivalent to £ in ), with the principal purpose of carrying water to Wilford Hill reservoir.

Responsibility for the bridge was transferred from the Nottingham Corporation Water Department to the Severn Trent Water Authority in April 1974, upon the reorganisation of the water industry in England and Wales, and subsequently to Severn Trent Water in 1989 prior to the privatisation of the water industry.

Following a restoration in 1983, the bridge was closed to pedestrians in July 2008 for a major restoration, following reports of falling debris.  It re-opened on 12 February 2010 after a £1.9m refurbishment.

Technical details
Gas main — two  diameter pipes
Water main — one  diameter pipe

See also
List of crossings of the River Trent

References

Further reading

Suspension bridges in the United Kingdom
Grade II listed buildings in Nottinghamshire
Grade II listed bridges
Bridges across the River Trent
Bridges completed in 1906
Bridges in Nottingham
West Bridgford
Pedestrian bridges in England
1906 establishments in England
Cyclist bridges in the United Kingdom